Nikolaos "Nikos" Baxevanos (born 16 July 1999) is a Greek professional footballer who plays as a centre-back for Super League 2 club Kalamata.

Personal life
He is the son of Spyros Baxevanos.

References

1999 births
Living people
Footballers from Thessaloniki
Greek footballers
Greece youth international footballers
Greek expatriate footballers
Association football defenders
Serie A players
Super League Greece players
Liga I players
S.S. Lazio players
Panionios F.C. players
FC Botoșani players
FC Politehnica Iași (2010) players
AFC Chindia Târgoviște players
Greek expatriate sportspeople in Romania
Greek expatriate sportspeople in Serbia
Greek expatriate sportspeople in Italy
Expatriate footballers in Romania
Expatriate footballers in Italy
Expatriate footballers in Serbia
FK Spartak Subotica players